Earias fabia, called the cotton spotted bollworm as a larva, is a moth of the family Nolidae. The species was first described by Caspar Stoll in 1781. It is sometimes included in the species Earias vittella.

Larval food plants are Gossypium hirsutum, Abelmoschus esculentus, Urena lobata, Brassica oleracea and Zea mays.

References

External links
Growth of the cotton spotted bollworm, Earias fabia (Lepidoptera: Noctuidae) in relation to consumption, nutritive value and utilization of food from various plants
Differentiation of sex in pupae of spotted bollworm, Earias fabia
Ovipositional responses of the cotton spotted bollworm, Earias fabia (Lepidoptera: Noctuidae) in relation to its establishment on various plants
Survival and Egg-production of the Cotton Spotted Bollworm, Earias fabia Stoll (Lepidoptera: Noctuidae) in Relation to Plant Infestation
Bio-Control Cases
Spotted boll-worms of cotton (Earias fabia Stoll and Earias insulana Boisd) in South Gujarat
Thiotepa - a potential chemosterilant for spotted boll worm  Stoll (Lepidoptera: Noctuidae) I - Effect on testis
Mass rearing of the spotted bollworm, Earias vittella (Lepidoptera: Noctuidae) on an artificial diet
Variations in the Development Program of Earias fabia Reared on Whole or Excised Fruits of Okra or on Their Components

Moths of Asia
Moths described in 1781
Nolidae